Bone breaking may refer to:

 A bone fracture
 A type of street dance, also called flexing